Manoj Sachdev from the University of Waterloo, Waterloo, ON, Canada was named Fellow of the Institute of Electrical and Electronics Engineers (IEEE) in 2012 for contributions to test methodology for very large scale integrated circuits.

References 

Fellow Members of the IEEE
Living people
Year of birth missing (living people)